Haidach gas storage is an underground natural gas storage in the town of Haidach near Salzburg, Austria. As of the end of 2018 with a capacity of ~2.9 billion cubic meters (bcm) it is the third largest (after Rehden with volume of ~4.7bcm and Bergermeer of ~4.5bcm of capacity) gas storage facility in Central Europe.

History
In 1997, Rohöl-Aufsuchungs Aktiengesellschaft (RAG) discovered the Haidach gas reservoir holding a total gas in place of 4.3 billion cubic meters (bcm).  After depletion of the reservoir, it was planned to convert into a gas storage. The contract for use of the Haidach reservoir as a storage for natural gas was signed between RAG, Wingas and Gazprom Export on 13 May 2005. Construction works started in 2005. The gas storage started officially operating on 24 May 2007.

Technical features
The operating capacity of the gas storage in the first phase is 1.2 bcm. In April 2011, after completing the second phase, the operating capacity would be doubled.

The construction of the first stage cost €250 millions.

Ownership
Haidach gas storage is a joint project of RAG, Wingas and Gazprom Export. It is operated by Austrian energy company EVN.

References

Natural gas storage
Natural gas in Austria
Energy infrastructure in Austria
Gazprom